John Moberly may refer to:

 John Moberly (cricketer)
 John Moberly (Royal Navy officer)
 John Moberly (diplomat), UK ambassador to Iraq, 1982–1985

See also
 John Mobberly, Confederate guerrilla during the American Civil War